Roy Walsh (6 September 1936 – 4 January 2019) was a British diver. He competed in two events at the 1956 Summer Olympics.

References

External links
 
 

1936 births
2019 deaths
British male divers
Olympic divers of Great Britain
Divers at the 1956 Summer Olympics
Place of birth missing